45 Wine and Whiskey is a bar and restaurant in Manhattan's Trump Tower, in the U.S. state of New York. The bar opened in November 2021.

Description
The interior features gold banisters, peach marble walls, and 39 photographs of Donald Trump. The Forty Five has whiskey with syrup and bitters, and is served with two hamburgers and a Diet Coke. The Flotus is a mixture of white wine and gin. The Mar-a-Lago spritzer has wine, soda water, and grapefruit juice.

References

External links 

2021 establishments in New York City
Donald Trump
Drinking establishments in New York City
Midtown Manhattan
Restaurants established in 2021